Rosenblueth is a surname that can refer to:
 Arturo Rosenblueth (1900–1970), Mexican researcher, physician and physiologist
 Emilio Rosenblueth (1926–1994), Mexican engineer

See also
 Rosenbluth, a surname